The Odd Fellows Hall in Beaver, Utah was built in 1903 in Early Commercial architecture style.  Its original owner was probably Charles C. Woodhouse.   It served historically as a clubhouse, as a meeting hall of Odd Fellows, and as a specialty store.  It was listed on the National Register of Historic Places in 1983.

It is a two-story brick commercial building, one of only four surviving-with-integrity historic commercial buildings on Beaver's Main Street.  Its first floor is a storefront with display windows and an indented entry;  its second floor is mad eof pressed metal made to resemble stone.  It has a pressed metal cornice with "IOOF" initials of the International Order of Odd Fellows.

References

Commercial buildings completed in 1903
Buildings and structures in Beaver County, Utah
Clubhouses on the National Register of Historic Places in Utah
Commercial buildings on the National Register of Historic Places in Utah
Buildings designated early commercial in the National Register of Historic Places
Odd Fellows buildings in Utah
National Register of Historic Places in Beaver County, Utah